Edward Mensor (November 7, 1885 – April 20, 1970) was an outfielder in Major League Baseball. Nicknamed "The Midget", he played for the Pittsburgh Pirates. He was born in Woodville, Oregon, and was Jewish. He died in Salem, Oregon.

References

External links

1885 births
1970 deaths
Major League Baseball outfielders
Pittsburgh Pirates players
Baseball players from Oregon
Sportspeople from Salem, Oregon
Portland Beavers players
Portland Pippins players
Portland Colts players
Pendleton Buckaroos players
Newark Indians players
Harrisburg Senators players
Spokane Indians players
Oakland Oaks (baseball) players
Calgary Bronchos players
Jewish American baseball players
Jewish Major League Baseball players
People from Rogue River, Oregon